A constitutional referendum was held in Georgia on 2 November 2003 alongside parliamentary elections. The constitutional changes proposed would reduce the number of seats in the next Parliament of Georgia from 235 to 150.

With almost 90% voting in favour, the changes were first implemented following the 2008 Georgian legislative election.

Background
Prior to the referendum, citizens groups had gathered 218,000 signatures on a petition calling for a reduction in the number of MPs, higher than the 200,000 required for a constitutional initiative. On 3 September 2003 President Eduard Shevardnadze signed a decree approving the referendum.

Results

References

2003 referendums
2003 in Georgia (country)
Referendums in Georgia (country)
Constitutional referendums